Anthospermum asperuloides is a species of flowering plant in the family Rubiaceae. It is found in eastern Cameroon and on the island of Bioko, which is part of Equatorial Guinea. Its natural habitat is subtropical or tropical dry lowland grassland.

References

Sources

External links 
 World Checklist of Rubiaceae

Anthospermeae
Near threatened plants
Flora of Cameroon
Flora of Equatorial Guinea
Plants described in 1862
Taxonomy articles created by Polbot
Taxa named by Joseph Dalton Hooker